Boniface Ngairah Ambani (born 4 November 1982 in Naivasha) is a retired Kenyan professional footballer, who last played for Young Africans and Kenya national football team.

Career 
The topscorer of the Kenyan Premier League 2006 with 20 goals for Tusker, signed for Indian club East Bengal Club in the early 2006.

He spent his last season with Tanzanian club Young Africans, where he scored 18 goals in 22 matches. After an Achilles tendon retired in the Spring 2010.

Notes

External links
 

1982 births
Living people
People from Nakuru County
Kenyan footballers
Kenya international footballers
Kenyan expatriate sportspeople in India
Expatriate footballers in India
Young Africans S.C. players
Expatriate footballers in Tanzania
East Bengal Club players
Tusker F.C. players
Oserian F.C. players

Association football forwards
Tanzanian Premier League players